Mabel Island is an island in Franz Josef Land, Russia.

History
This island was named by Benjamin Leigh Smith after his niece Amable Ludlow (1860–1939).

The southernmost headland of Mabel Island is Cape Konrad, named after Russian sailor Alexander Konrad, one of the only two survivors of the Brusilov expedition.

Geography
Most of the island is covered by an ice cap, but an area at the southwestern side is unglacierized.
Mys Pinegina is the headland on the eastern side. 

Bates Channel is the roughly  sound to the north and northeast of Mabel Island that separates it from Bruce Island.
The sound in the western side, beyond which lies Zemlya Georga to the NW, is known as the Nightingale Channel (Proliv Naytingeyl). 

Ostrov Bell (Остров Белл; Bell Island) is a smaller non glacierized island lying off Mabel Island's southwestern shore, separated from it by the Eyre Channel, a narrow sound of only  in some places.

See also 
 List of islands of Russia

References

Islands of Franz Josef Land